On August 16, 1987 a McDonnell Douglas MD-82, operating as Northwest Airlines Flight 255, crashed shortly after takeoff from Detroit Metropolitan Airport, about 8:46 pm EDT (00:46 UTC August 17), resulting in the deaths of all six crew members and 148 of the 149 passengers, along with two people on the ground. The sole survivor was a 4-year-old  girl who sustained serious injuries. It was the second-deadliest aviation accident at the time in the United States. It is also the deadliest aviation accident to have a sole survivor.

Aircraft and crew

The aircraft involved in the crash was a twin-engined McDonnell Douglas MD-82 (registration number N312RC), a derivative of the McDonnell Douglas DC-9 and part of the McDonnell Douglas MD-80 series of aircraft. The jet was manufactured in 1981, entered service with Republic Airlines, and was acquired by Northwest Airlines in its merger with Republic in 1986. The aircraft was powered by two Pratt & Whitney JT8D-217 turbofan engines. At the time of the accident, the aircraft was painted in a hybrid livery between Northwest Airlines and Republic Airlines, featuring blue Republic striping with red Northwest titles and a white tail.

Flight 255's captain was 57-year-old John R. Maus, from Las Vegas, Nevada. Maus was an experienced pilot who had worked for the airline for 31 years, flying Fairchild F-27, Boeing 727, Boeing 757, McDonnell Douglas DC-9, and McDonnell Douglas MD-80 aircraft. Maus had logged 20,859 flight hours during his career, including 1,359 hours on the MD-82. Other pilots who had flown with Maus described him as a "competent and capable pilot" who had a reputation for operating "by the book".

The flight's first officer was 35-year-old David J. Dodds, from Galena, Illinois. Dodds had logged 8,044 flight hours during his career (including 1,604 hours on the MD-82), and had worked for the airline for more than eight years. Other than one training report during his probationary period, all of the airline's captains with whom Dodds had flown graded him as average or above average. Other pilots who had recently flown with Dodds later described his performance 
in favorable terms. Four flight attendants were also on board.

Accident
The flight crew began August 16, 1987, by operating the incident aircraft as Northwest Flight 750 from Minneapolis–Saint Paul International Airport, flying to MBS International Airport in Saginaw, Michigan. Departing Saginaw, the flight crew operated the same aircraft as Flight 255, flying to John Wayne Airport in Santa Ana, California, with intermediate stops scheduled at Detroit Metropolitan Wayne County Airport in Romulus, Michigan (near Detroit), and Phoenix Sky Harbor International Airport in Arizona. Other than a minor problem taxiing to the arrival gate, the flight from Saginaw to Detroit was uneventful. During the stopover in Detroit, a Northwest Airlines mechanic inspected the aircraft and the logbook. Around 20:29, the flight crew took their seats. At roughly 20:32 EDT, Flight 255 departed the gate in Detroit with 149 passengers (including 21 children) and six crew members. The crew read out the before-start checklist, and started the engines at 20:33:04.

At 20:34:40, the pushback tug was disconnected from the aircraft and at 20:34:50, the controller cleared Flight 255 to taxi to runway number 3C (center). The crew was also informed about the update of the automatic terminal information service information, to which Dodds reported on weather data update. At 20:35:43, the ground controller instructed to use taxiway C and switch to frequency 119.45 MHz to communicate with another controller. Dodds acknowledged the instructions to follow the taxiways, but did not repeat the new frequency and did not tune the radio to it. The dispatch packet provided by the airline included takeoff performance data based on using runways 21L or 21R, but the flight was cleared for takeoff on Detroit's runway 3C, the shortest available runway. The flight crew had to reconfigure the on-board computer for taking off on runway 3C. Dodds also recalculated the allowable takeoff weight for the flight, and concluded that it was within normal limits. In the process of taxiing, Flight 255 missed the required turn, so Dodds contacted the ground controller and received instructions on how to proceed to runway 3C, and also to switch to 119.45 MHz. Dodds again acknowledged the instructions and this time acknowledged the new frequency and switched to it. The second ground controller specified the route to runway 3C. The crew also received a brief weather report.

At 20:42:11, Flight 255 was instructed to line up and wait at the beginning of runway 3C. The controller advised that a 3-minute delay was needed to allow the wake turbulence from the previous aircraft that had taken off to dissipate. At 20:44:04, Flight 255 was cleared for takeoff.

Flight 255 made its takeoff roll on Detroit's runway 3C at 20:44:21, with Maus at the controls, as recorded on the aircraft's cockpit voice recorder (CVR):

The MD-82's rate of climb was greatly reduced as a result of the flaps not being extended, and about  past the end of runway 3C, the plane's left wing struck a light pole in an airport rental car lot. The impact caused the left wing to start disintegrating and catch fire. The plane rolled 90° to the left, striking the roof of an Avis Car Rental building. The now uncontrolled plane crashed inverted onto Middlebelt Road and struck vehicles just north of its intersection with Wick Road, killing two people on the ground in a car. It then broke apart, with the fuselage skidding across the road, disintegrating and bursting into flames as it hit a Norfolk Southern railroad overpass and the overpass of eastbound Interstate 94.

Victims
All of the six crew and 148 of the 149 passengers are killed in the crash. Many of the passengers were from the Phoenix metropolitan area; one of them was Nick Vanos, an NBA center for the Phoenix Suns. Two motorists on nearby Middlebelt Road also perished and five people on the ground were injured, one seriously. The bodies were moved to the Northwest hangar at the airport, which served as a temporary morgue.

Passengers
Of the 149 passengers aboard, 21 were children, the youngest being six months old. The sole survivor of the crash was Cecilia Cichan, a four-year-old girl from Tempe, Arizona, who was returning home alongside her mother, Paula, father, Michael, and a six-year-old brother, David, after visiting relatives in Pennsylvania. Romulus firemen found Cichan still belted in her seat, which was faced down. She was found several feet from the bodies of her family. She sustained severe burns and fractures to her skull, collarbone, and left leg. After the crash, Cichan moved to live with her maternal aunt and uncle in Birmingham, Alabama. She spoke to the media about her experience for the first time in 2011.

Investigation

The National Transportation Safety Board (NTSB) investigated the crash.

Eyewitnesses stated that Flight 255's takeoff roll was longer than usual and that the aircraft took off at a steeper angle. Their statements on whether or not the flaps and slats were extended varied, but most responded that they were extended, although they could not tell how far.

The CVR provided evidence of the flight crew's omission of the taxi checklist. Although the stall warning was annunciated, investigators determined from the CVR that the aural takeoff warning was not annunciated by that warning system. The NTSB was unable to determine a cause for the electrical-power failure in the central aural warning system (CAWS):

The investigators had spoken with other MD-80 pilots, and learned that many pilots found it a nuisance to hear a take-off configuration warning ("Slats ... Slats... Slats....") while they were simply taxiing. It was so common for pilots to pull the P-40 circuit breaker that the area around the circuit breaker was smudged from routinely being manipulated. This circuit breaker also controls some of the stall warning sounds. This coincided with the missing sounds from the CVR of the incident flight.

While the investigators felt that the P-40 circuit breaker probably had been pulled by the pilot on the incident flight, they could not definitely confirm if the circuit breaker had been tripped, intentionally opened, or if electric current failed to flow through the breaker to the CAWS while the breaker was closed:

NTSB conclusions
The NTSB published its final report on May 10, 1988, in which it concluded that the accident was caused by pilot error:

Aftermath
After the crash, Northwest retired the flight number 255 along with its counterpart flight number 254, which was the outbound flight from Phoenix to Detroit. They were changed to Flights 260 and 261 beginning in September 1987 until the company merged with Delta Air Lines in early 2010. It was still operated by MD-82 alongside DC-9 and Boeing 727 but were replaced by Boeing 757 and Airbus A320 in the 1990s.

Memorials

In memory of the victims, a black granite memorial was erected in 1994; it stands (surrounded by blue spruce trees) at the top of the hill at Middlebelt Road and I-94, the site of the crash. The memorial has a dove with a ribbon in its beak reading, "Their spirit still lives on ..."; below it are the names of those who perished in the crash. Another monument to the victims (many of whom were from the Phoenix area) stands next to Phoenix City Hall.
Also, a marker stone is located at the General Motors Proving Ground in Milford, MI, in memory of the 14 GM employees and seven family members who were killed in the crash.  Most were traveling to the GM Desert Proving Ground in Mesa, Arizona.

On August 16, 2007, the 20th anniversary of the crash, a memorial service was held at the site. For some people affected by the incident, this was their first return to the site since the crash.

On August 16, 2012, the 25th anniversary of the crash, another memorial service was held at the crash site. Family and friends of the victims and others from across the Metro Detroit area (including local media) attended, and a local priest read each victim's name aloud. Another was held there on August 16, 2017, the 30th anniversary.<ref
      name    = DetroitN2017
></ref> Annual meet-ups had become a tradition.<ref
  name = DetroitN2017
/>

In popular culture
The crash of Northwest Airlines Flight 255 was covered in 2010 in "Alarming Silence", a season-9 episode of the internationally syndicated Canadian TV documentary series Mayday.

The sole survivor of the crash was a four-year old child who appeared in the 2013 documentary Sole Survivor. She did not speak publicly about the crash until 2013, when the documentary was released.

In 2016, motorsport journalist Tom Higgins posted his recollections of Northwest 255.  Higgins, then of The Charlotte Observer, and fellow NASCAR beat reporters Steve Waid and Gary McCredie (of Grand National Scene) arrived at a hotel near the Detroit Metropolitan Airport awaiting a Monday morning flight to Charlotte, North Carolina, after finishing coverage of the Champion Spark Plug 400 that afternoon at Michigan International Speedway, and were witnesses to the plane crash.  For years, Higgins feared the August NASCAR weekend after this crash, noting how he was a witness on Middlebelt Road.

In Busy Philipps' 2018 memoir This Will Only Hurt a Little, Philipps mentioned that her friend Megan Briggs died the summer going into 5th grade on this plane crash. Her friend was eight years old and died alongside her parents and older brother.

See also
 Spanair Flight 5022 – Another MD-82 that failed to lift off due to improper take-off configuration 
 List of aircraft accidents and incidents resulting in at least 50 fatalities
 List of sole survivors of airline accidents or incidents

Notes

References

External links
 Northwest Flight 255 Memorial Website
 Pre-crash photos of N312RC on Airliners.net

Accident description at Check-six.com
 
 

Airliner accidents and incidents in Michigan
Airliner accidents and incidents caused by pilot error
Aviation accidents and incidents in the United States in 1987
1987 in Michigan
Detroit Metropolitan Airport
Disasters in Michigan
Flight 255
Accidents and incidents involving the McDonnell Douglas MD-82
255
August 1987 events in the United States
Pages with unreviewed translations
Airliner accidents and incidents caused by stalls
Sole survivors